Andriy Kvyatkovskyi (also transliterated Andrii Kviatkovskyi, born 2 February 1990 in Kalush) is a Ukrainian freestyle wrestler. He competed in the 66 kg event at the 2012 and 2016 Summer Olympics.

Career
At the 2012 Summer Olympics, he reached the second round, where he lost to Akzhurek Tanatarov.

He competed in the freestyle 70 kg event at the 2016 European Wrestling Championships; after defeating Nicolai Chireacov of Moldova in the round 16, he was eliminated by  Azamat Nurykau of Belarus in quarterfinals.

In May 2016, he was provisionally suspended due to use of meldonium. Later that decision was reverted.

During the men's freestyle 65 kg quarterfinals of the 2016 Summer Olympics Kvyatkovskyi bit opponent Frank Molinaro on the forearm and attempted to injure Molinaro with a move designed to break his knee prior.

At the Golden Grand Prix Ivan Yarygin 2018 he won the bronze medal at 70 kilos.

References

External links
 
 
 

1990 births
Living people
Ukrainian male sport wrestlers
Olympic wrestlers of Ukraine
Wrestlers at the 2012 Summer Olympics
Wrestlers at the 2016 Summer Olympics
European Games competitors for Ukraine
Wrestlers at the 2015 European Games
People from Kalush, Ukraine
Doping cases in wrestling
Ukrainian sportspeople in doping cases
Sportspeople from Ivano-Frankivsk Oblast